A traditional IRA is an individual retirement arrangement (IRA), established in the United States by the Employee Retirement Income Security Act of 1974 (ERISA) (codified in part at ). Normal IRAs also existed before ERISA.

Overview
An author described the traditional IRA in 1982 as "the biggest tax break in history". The IRA is held at a custodian institution such as a bank or brokerage, and may be invested in anything that the custodian allows (for instance, a bank may allow certificates of deposit, and a brokerage may allow stocks and mutual funds). Unlike the Roth IRA, the only criterion for being eligible to contribute to a traditional IRA is sufficient income to make the contribution. However, the best provision of a traditional IRA — the tax-deductibility of contributions — has strict eligibility requirements based on income, filing status, and availability of other retirement plans (mandated by the Internal Revenue Service). Transactions in the account, including interest, dividends, and capital gains, are not subject to tax while still in the account, but upon withdrawal from the account, withdrawals are subject to federal income tax (see below for details). This is in contrast to a Roth IRA, in which contributions are never tax-deductible, but qualified withdrawals are tax free. The traditional IRA also has more restrictions on withdrawals than a Roth IRA. With both types of IRA, transactions inside the account (including capital gains, dividends, and interest) incur no tax liability.

According to IRS pension/retirement department as of July 13, 2009, traditional IRAs (originally called Regular IRAs) were created in 1975 and made available for tax reporting that year as well. The original contribution amount in 1975 was limited to $1,500 or 15% of the wages/salaries/tips reported on line 8 of Form 1040 (1975).
 
Annual traditional IRA contributions are limited as follows:

Since 2009, contribution limits have been assessed for potential increases based on inflation.

Advantages
 The primary benefit of any tax deferred savings plan, such as an IRA, is that the amount of money available to invest is larger than would be the case with a post-tax savings plan, such as a Roth IRA. This means that the multiplier effect of compound interest, or for example, larger reinvested dividends, will yield a larger sum over time. Financial institutions also generally give higher rates of interest to larger sums invested in instruments such as certificates of deposit; however, this comes with the risk that, over a significant period of time, the eventual rate of income tax levied on withdrawal is unforeseeable — and could be higher than originally anticipated.
 While many people think that the reduction in taxes in the year of contribution is a benefit, that is not necessarily the case. While it is true that the unpaid taxes can be immediately invested and continue to grow, taxes on these gains will need to eventually be paid—either on an ongoing basis, if invested in a non-tax-deferred vehicle (e.g. if pre-tax options are already maximized), or at withdrawal otherwise. Assuming that both the tax deduction and the tax on its reinvestment gains only affect the individual's top tax bracket, the results are tax-neutral. Any potential benefits of claiming and reinvesting a tax deduction come from the expectation that the taxpayer may be in a lower tax bracket during retirement.
 The only benefit that everyone receives is the income's protection from tax. This equals the dollars of tax that would have been paid on the income if earned in a taxable account. It exactly equals the benefit of a Roth IRA.
 Unlike a Roth IRA, there is another possible benefit (or penalty) equal to the reduction (or increase) in tax rates between the contribution and withdrawal, multiplied by the dollars withdrawn. Many taxpayers expect to be in a lower tax bracket in retirement. While the tax benefits from contributions are considered to be at the contributor's marginal tax rate, the withdrawals may add income at lower progressive tax brackets.
 An IRA protects wealth from creditors, but also cannot be used as collateral when borrowing.
 With a traditional IRA, one always has an option to convert to a Roth IRA; whereas a Roth IRA cannot be converted back into a traditional IRA. One can choose an optimal (lowest tax rate) time to convert over one's life. Because you have a right, but not an obligation, to convert, this is like an option in finance. As with options in finance, this flexibility, which allows one to hedge future uncertainty, adds some additional value to the traditional IRA.

Disadvantages
 One must meet the eligibility requirements to qualify for tax benefits. If one is an active participant in a retirement plan at work, one's income must be below a specific threshold for your filing status. If one's income (and thus tax rate) is that low, it might make more sense to pay taxes now (Roth IRA) rather than defer them (traditional IRA).
 All withdrawals from a traditional IRA are included in gross income, which are subject to federal income tax (with the exception of any nondeductible contributions; there is a formula for determining how much of a withdrawal is not subject to tax). This tax is in lieu of the original tax on employment income, which had been deferred in the year of the contribution. It is not taxed on the gains of said contributions while inside the account.
 Because taxes (and maybe penalties) must be paid before cash in the account can be withdrawn and used, this account is hard to use for emergencies.
 The size of an IRA account may mislead people into believing their wealth is larger than it actually is. The tax benefit from contributions is essentially a loan that must be paid back on withdrawal. Net wealth calculations must subtract an estimate of that tax. This effect means that $xx saved in a traditional IRA is not equal to $xx saved in a Roth IRA. Contributions to a traditional IRA are from pre-tax income and contributions to a Roth are from after-tax income.
 Withdrawals must begin by age 72 (more precisely, by April 1 of the calendar year after age 72 is reached) according to a formula. If an investor fails to make the required withdrawal, half of the mandatory amount will be confiscated automatically by the IRS. The Roth is completely free of these mandates. This creates taxable income. Any withdrawal not needed for spending has lost its tax shelter on future growth.
 In addition to the contribution being included as taxable income, the IRS will also assess a 10% early withdrawal penalty if the participant is under age 59½. The IRS will waive this penalty with some exceptions, including first time home purchase (up to $10,000), higher education expenses, death, disability, un-reimbursed medical expenses, health insurance, annuity payments and payments of IRS levies, all of which must meet certain stipulations.
 The recognition of taxable income in retirement instead of when working may affect a person's qualification for government benefits that are income-tested. The loss of these benefits can be evaluated by including them in the calculation of the tax rate on withdrawals.

Eligibility to contribute to a traditional IRA 

 A taxpayer must earn qualified income in order to make a contribution.  Also, a taxpayer's IRA contributions cannot exceed that taxpayer's income in a given year.  For example, if a taxpayer makes a total of $2000 in taxable compensation in a given year, then the maximum IRA contribution is $2000.  Note, income from investments may not be qualified as eligible for the purposes of IRA contributions.

Income limits only apply to certain taxpayers
All United States income taxpayers can make IRA contributions and defer the taxation on the earnings. However, not all IRA contributions are deductible from a taxpayer's income tax. 

If one or more members of a household participates in an employer-sponsored retirement plan, and the taxpayer's Modified Adjusted Gross Income is above the amount listed in the table below, then some or all of the taxpayer's IRA contribution will not be tax deductible.  Consequently, traditional IRAs are sometimes further classified and referred to as either "deductible" or "non-deductible."  Except as otherwise noted, all columns below are for IRA contributors who participate in an employer-sponsored retirement plan.

The lower number represents the point at which the taxpayer is still allowed to deduct the entire maximum yearly contribution. The upper number is the point as of which the taxpayer is no longer allowed to deduct any of that year's contribution. The deduction is reduced proportionally for taxpayers in the range. Note that people who are married and lived together, but who file separately, are only allowed to deduct a relatively small amount.

Converting a traditional IRA to a Roth IRA
Conversion of all or a part of a traditional IRA account to a Roth IRA results in the converted funds being taxed as income in the year they are converted (with the exception of non-deductible assets).

Prior to 2010, two circumstances prohibit a conversion to a Roth IRA: Modified Adjusted Gross Income exceeding $100,000 or the participant's tax filing status is Married Filing Separately. With recent legislation, as part of the Tax Increase Prevention and Reconciliation Act of 2005 (TIPRA), the modified AGI requirement of $100,000 and not be married filing separately criteria were removed in 2010.

There may be a benefit from conversion in addition to the preferential timing of tax. The taxes due need not come from the account balance converted. If the taxes are paid from another taxable account, the effect is as if the income from those dollars are sheltered from tax.

Transfers versus rollovers
Transfers and rollovers are two ways of moving IRA sheltered assets between financial institutions.

A transfer is normally initiated by the institution receiving the funds. A request is sent to the disbursing institution for a transfer and a check (made payable to the other institution) is sent in return. This transaction is not reported to the IRS. Transfers are allowed to and from traditional IRAs or from employer plans.

A rollover (sometimes referred to as a 60-day rollover) can also be used to move IRA money between institutions. A distribution is made from the institution disbursing the funds. A check would be made payable directly to the participant. The participant would then have to make a rollover contribution to the receiving financial institution within 60 days in order for the funds to retain their IRA status. This type of transaction can only be done once every 12 months with the same funds. Contrary to a transfer, a rollover is reported to the IRS. The participant who received the distribution will have that distribution reported to the IRS. Once the distribution is rolled into an IRA, the participant will be sent a Form 5498 to report on their taxes to nullify any tax consequence of the initial distribution.

"Borrowing money" from an IRA
A loan from an IRA is prohibited. It is considered a prohibited transaction and the IRS may disqualify your plan and tax you on the assets. Some use the 60-day rollover as a way to temporarily take funds from an IRA. A participant will take a distribution and, in turn, all or some of the distribution that the participant takes may be rolled back into the same IRA plan within the allowed period to retain its tax deferred status. One 60-day rollover is allowed every rolling 12 months, per IRA. For instance, if you withdraw any amount from IRA-1 and deposit it into IRA-2 (as a tax-free rollover), you cannot make another tax-free rollover of any funds from IRA-1 or IRA-2 for 365 days. However, this would not prevent you from making a tax-free rollover from another IRA.

See also
Comparison of 401(k) and IRA accounts
Form 1099-R

External links

IRS Publication 590-A (IRA Contributions) (pdf) (html)
IRS Publication 590-B (IRA Distributions) (pdf) (html)
 IRA Limits sites.google.com

Notes and references 

Individual retirement accounts